Redshirt, Red Shirt, or Redshirts may refer to:

Entertainment
 Red Shirts (film), a 1952 film about Anita Garibaldi by Franco Rossi
 Redshirt (stock character), originally derived from Star Trek, a stock character who dies soon after being introduced
 Redshirts (novel), a 2012 novel by John Scalzi
 "Redshirts" (song), a 2012 song by Jonathan Coulton
 Redshirt (video game), a 2013 video game by Mitu Khandaker

Places
 Red Shirt Lake, a lake in Alaska
 Red Shirt, South Dakota, a Lakota village in South Dakota
 Red Shirt Table, a table mountain in South Dakota

Politics
 Khudai Khidmatgar or Red Shirts, a Pashtun movement against British rule in colonial India
 Redshirts (Italy), followers of guerrilla leader Giuseppe Garibaldi
 Red Shirts (Mexico), a Mexican anti-Catholic paramilitary organization of the 1930s
 Abahlali baseMjondolo or Red shirts, a South African shack-dwellers' movement
 Red Shirts (Taiwan) or Million Voices Against Corruption, President Chen Must Go
 Red Shirts (Thailand), a political movement in Thailand opposing the 2006 military coup
 Red Shirts (United States), a militant white supremacist group during and after the Reconstruction Era

People
 Red Shirt (Oglala) (1847–1925), chief of the Oglala Sioux tribe
 Delphine Red Shirt (born 1957), Oglala Lakota Sioux writer

Other uses
 Redshirt (college sports), delaying a college athlete's participation to lengthen eligibility
 Red Shirt School of Photography, a trend pioneered by National Geographic photographers

See also
 Redshirting (academic), the practice of postponing entrance into kindergarten
 Kuilix, Pend d'Oreilles tribal war leader
 Lalkurti (literal translation: Red Shirt), a locality in Rawalpindi cantonment in Pakistan